Capital University of Economics and Business (CUEB) is a modern, multi-disciplinary financial and economic public university in Beijing, China. Founded in 1956 when the Ministry of Education founded the Beijing Economics Institute. In 1995, The Beijing government combined the Beijing Economics Institute and the Beijing Finance and Trade Institute creating Capital University of Economics and Business. CUEB is one of Beijing's three key universities, a member of Beijing-Hong Kong Universities Alliance.

The Capital University of Economics and Business consistently ranks in the top 10 nationwide among universities specialized in finance, business, and economics according to the recognized Best Chinese Universities Ranking. In the 2021 Academic Ranking of World Universities (ARWU) by Subjects, CUEB ranks in the global top 300-400 in "Economics".

History 

Capital University of Economics and Business is a key university in Beijing. On 24 March 1995, the National Education Commission approved the merger of the Beijing Institute of Economics and the Beijing Institute of Finance and Trade. The name of the school was designated as the Capital University of Economics and Business.

The predecessor of the Beijing Institute of Economics was the Beijing Labor Cadre School and the Beijing Experimental Workers Technical School, which were established in 1956. The Beijing Experimental Workers Technical School was relocated from Beijing to the Second Machinery Department Shenyang 211 Technical School. In October 1958, the Ministry of Labor approved the merger of the two schools to form the Beijing Labor College. In 1962, the Beijing Labor College was closed. In February 1963, the State Council approved the establishment of the Beijing Institute of Engineering Economics based on the Beijing Institute of Labor. On 7 June, the State Council approved the change of the Beijing Institute of Engineering Economics to the Beijing Institute of Economics. The school was closed during the Cultural Revolution. On 22 April 1974, the Beijing Economic College was established with the approval of the State Council. In 1986, the Beijing Institute of Economics was listed as a key university in Beijing.

The predecessor of Beijing Finance and Trade College is the Beijing Municipal Finance and Trade Cadre School established in 1958. The Beijing Municipal Finance and Trade Cadre School was established by the merger of Beijing Commercial Cadre School, Beijing Commercial Workers School, Beijing Food Cadre School, Beijing Supply and Marketing Cooperative Cadre School, Beijing Service Bureau Staff Training Class, and Bank of Beijing Training Class. On 15 March 1960, the General Office of the Beijing Municipal People's Committee approved the establishment of the Beijing Finance and Trade Secondary Professional School. In August 1962, Beijing Municipal Finance and Trade School operated independently. The school was abolished during the Cultural Revolution. In October 1972, the Beijing Finance and Trade School was established. In 1973, it was established and named "Beijing Finance and Economics School". In 1975, it was renamed "Beijing Finance and Trade School." On 28 December 1978, the Ministry of Education issued the "Notice on Consent to Reinstatement and Addition of a Group of Ordinary Colleges and Universities", and added the Beijing Finance and Trade College as an ordinary higher education institution.

Campus 

The two campuses are collectively 360,000 square yards and have a campus library that houses over 1.6 million books, and more than 2,500 periodicals in both Chinese and foreign languages.  The old Hongmiao campus is located between the East 3rd and 4th ring roads, and is a 5-minute walk to Beijing's Central Business District (CBD). The main campus is located between the southwest 3rd and 4th ring roads in the Xincun Subdistrict in Fengtai District of Beijing, which is accessible via Capital Univ. of Economics & Business station, a subway station of Line 10 and Fangshan line.

Academic 

Currently the University consists of more than 30 colleges and departments and offers more than 30 Undergraduate degrees,  28 master's degrees including MBA, and 9 Doctoral programs.

The university's key areas of research are in Applied Economics, Labor Economics, Enterprise Management, Industrial Economics, Banking, and Finance.

CUEB employees 750 instructors for the programs, of those 239 hold doctoral degrees.  Among CUEB's 127 full professors are 9 who have received distinctions from either the Beijing or Chinese government. The remaining instructors are either associate professors (312) or advisers for the doctoral and graduate students (294). 
 
CUEB has founded over 25 economic research centers and institutes that focus on a wide range of areas including the World Trade Organization, Enterprise Development, Social Security, Real Estate Development.

Each year CUEB publishes 4 academic journals, with the "Research of Economics and Management" being one of the highest rated journals in the China and the Chinese Social Sciences Citation Index (CSSI).

In the 8th issue Philosophy and Social Science of Beijing 5 papers from CUEB faculty were honored with 1 being declared "first class" by the committee.  The paper was also selected by the Ministry of National Education as the "Best Book" for the 14th issue, and was chosen by the Chongqing Municipality to be awarded the "first class excellent achievement prize.

Administration 

The administrative framework of the university is as follows:

Departmental Structure
 College for Urban Economics and Public Administration
 The College of Business Administration	
 School of Economics
 School of Accounting	
 School of Labor Economics	
 School of Culture and Communication
 School of Information	
 School of Safety and Environmental Engineering	
 School of Public Finance and Taxation
 School of Law	
 School of Finance	
 The school of Statistics
 School of Foreign Studies
 Overseas Chinese College	
 School of Marxism Studies
 International School of Economic Management	
 School of International Education	
 School of Continuing Education
 MBA Education Center

International exchange

Asia 

Taiwan
Kaohsiung First University of Science and Technology, 
Soochow University, 
Providence University, 
University of Tainan, 
Chengchi University.

Japan 
Meijo University, 
Aichi University.

Hong Kong SAR 
Hong Kong Baptist University

North America 

United States
American University, 
Auburn University, 
Boston University, 
Florida State University, 
Georgetown University, 
North Carolina State University, 
Ohio State University, 
Rutgers, The State University of New Jersey, 
SUNY Binghamton, 
Syracuse University, 
Temple University, 
Texas A&M University, 
University of California at San Diego, 
University of Cincinnati, 
University of Illinois at Chicago, 
University of Maryland, 
University of Michigan, Ann Arbor, 
University of Texas, 
University of Utah, 
University of Washington.

Canada
ST. Francis Xavier University, 
University of Victoria, 
Laurentian University, 
Université de Montréal,

South America 

Argentina 
University of Buenos Aires

Europe 

German
Furtwangen University of Applied Sciences, 
Steinbeis-Hochschule-Berlin.

United Kingdom
The University of Manchester, 
University of Essex, 
University of Northampton, 
Plymouth University.

Sweden
Vaxjo (Linnax) University, 
Uppsala University.

Finland
Seinajoki University of Applied Science, 
Haaga-Helia University of Applied Sciences.

France 
Université Paris Diderot, 
ESC Brest, 
ESC Rennes, 
ESC Clermont-FerrandAdvancia-Negocia (Novancia), 
Université de Saint-Étienne, 
Université François Rabelais, 
Université Toulouse II, 
Universite Toulouse I.

Ireland 
Dublin City University Athlone Institute of Technology

Poland 
Poznan University of Economics,
Warsaw School of Economics.

Hungary 
Eotvos Lorand University

Oceania 

Australia
University of Canterbury, 
Queensland University of Technology, 
Deakin UniversityGriffith University.

Notable people
Notable alumni includes:
Bei Ling - Chinese Misty Poet
Maggie Wu - Chief Financial Officer of Alibaba Group
Yang Xiaochao - Secretary General of the Central Commission for Discipline Inspection
Tan Xiangdong - co-founder and CEO of HNA Group

References

External links
 Capital University of Economics and Business Official Website 
 Capital University of Economics and Business Official Website

Universities and colleges in Beijing
Schools in Fengtai District
Educational institutions established in 1956
1956 establishments in China